The Communist Party of Turkey/Marxist–Leninist (Türkiye Komünist Partisi/Marksist-Leninist in Turkish, abbreviated as TKP/ML) is a Marxist–Leninist–Maoist insurgent organization in Turkey involved in the Maoist military strategy of people's war against the Turkish government. It was founded in 1972 by a group of former members of the Revolutionary Workers and Peasants Party of Turkey (RWPPT), organised by İbrahim Kaypakkaya as TKP (M-L), who wished to carry out armed struggle.

The TKP/ML participates in the International Conference of Marxist-Leninist Parties and Organizations. It is designated as a terrorist organization by the Turkish state.

Organisation

The armed wing of the party is named the Liberation Army of the Workers and Peasants of Turkey (Türkiye İşci ve Köylü Kurtuluş Ordusu in Turkish, abbreviated as TİKKO).

The Marxist-Leninist Youth Union of Turkey (Türkiye Marksist Leninist Gençlik Birliği in Turkish, abbreviated as TMLGB) is the youth organization of TKP/ML. TMLGB, founded in 1972 as an organisation for youth workers, peasants, students and other youths from different production sectors under the Istanbul Province Committee. Mehmet Zeki Şerit (died in 1977 under torture) was the first chair of the TMLGB. TMLGB did not work actively until its first congress in 1987.

History

Following the military memorandum of 1971 the Turkish government cracked down on the communist movement in Turkey. Kaypakkaya and several of his colleagues were arrested. The party machinery was destroyed, while Kaypakkaya died in prison in 1973 as a result of torture.

The Communist Party of Turkey (Marxist–Leninist) re-organized between 1973 and 1978. The first party congress took place in 1978 (TKP (M-L) I. Kongresi in Turkish). In 1981 the second congress was organized (TKP (M-L) II. Kongresi).  The party split following the second congress, the splinter group taking up the name TKP/ML (Bolşevik), later Bolshevik Party (North Kurdistan-Turkey).

This was neither the first nor the last split in the party. The Communist Party of Turkey/Marxist–Leninist – Hareketi had already split in (1976) during the re-organisation period. Other splits followed the second congress: Communist Party of Turkey/Marxist-Leninist (Revolutionary Partisan) (1987), Communist Party of Turkey/Marxist-Leninist (Maoist Party Centre) (1987) and Communist Party of Turkey (Marxist-Leninist) (1994).

Activities

On 17 May 1985, TKP/ML broadcast a propaganda message to millions of television viewers in Istanbul, replacing the soundtrack for the evening news.

On 29 June 2010, two guerillas of the TİKKO were killed in the mountains of Tunceli by the Turkish state forces.

On 2 February 2011, five guerillas of TİKKO in Tunceli died as a result of an avalanche.

On 26 July 2013, the control building of a hydroelectric power plant regulator was bombed in the countryside of Tunceli Province by TİKKO militants.

On 14 March 2014, TİKKO guerrillas attacked a police station in Tunceli. TKP/ML declared that the attack was revenge for death of Berkin Elvan.

In 2016, the organization allegedly kidnapped Erkan Doğan, a civilian, who was later found executed.

The fight against ISIS 

In 2014, the organization sent a group of fighters to support the Kurds and other minorities in the fight against ISIS in Kobanî. Since then, the group has actively trained and supported the minorities in the fight against the extremist groups.

On 25 March 2016, the organization's headquarters in Serêkaniyê were targeted by a motorcycle bomb causing slight injuries to two members and damage to the headquarters.

On 14 August 2017, one of the commanders of TİKKO, Fermun Çırak (alias Nubar Ozanyan) died in the fight against ISIS. Ozanyan had trained Kurdish, Turkish, Armenian, Arab, Palestinian, Greek, Canadian, Sardinian, Belgian and French internationalist fighters against ISIS and other Islamist groups.

In 2018, ISIS tried to assassinate the members of the organization by mining the roads that were leading to the organization's headquarter. No casualties were reported.

Following the defeat of ISIS, the TIKKO turned attention to fighting the Turkish Backed Free Syrian Army

Designation as a terrorist organisation
The organisation is listed among the 12 active terrorist organisations in Turkey as of 2007, according to the Counter-Terrorism and Operations Department of the Directorate General for Security of the Turkish police.

Notable members
 İbrahim Kaypakkaya
 Barbara Kistler
 Ali Haydar Yıldız
 Nubar Ozanyan
 Lorenzo Orsetti

See also
 Maoist insurgency in Turkey
 List of illegal political parties in Turkey
 Communist Party of Turkey (disambiguation), for other groups using similar names
 Confederation of Workers from Turkey in Europe

References

External links
İşçi Köylü Kurtuluşu
Partizan archive
Twitter page

1972 establishments in Turkey
Anti-ISIL factions in Turkey
Anti-imperialist organizations
Anti-revisionist organizations
Banned communist parties
Banned political parties in Turkey
Communist parties in Turkey
Economic history of Turkey
Far-left politics in Turkey
International Coordination of Revolutionary Parties and Organizations
International Freedom Battalion
Kurdish organisations
Left-wing militant groups in Turkey
Maoist parties
Maoist organizations in Turkey
Organizations designated as terrorist by Turkey
Peoples' United Revolutionary Movement
Political parties established in 1972
Political parties in the Autonomous Administration of North and East Syria
Revolutionary Internationalist Movement